Katie Carr (born London, 1973) is an English actress and model. She may be best known for her appearances in Dinotopia as Marion and in Heroes as Caitlin.

Filmography

External links 
 

1973 births
English film actresses
English female models
English television actresses
Living people
Actresses from London
English expatriates in the United States